Hawar Mulla Mohammed Taher Zebari (born 1 June 1981) is an Iraqi former professional footballer.

He played as a winger or wingback for Al-Quwa Al-Jawiya, Al-Ansar, Apollon Limassol, Al Khor, Anorthosis, Persepolis, Esteghlal, Zob Ahan, and Erbil before retiring on 11 June 2015.

Hawar was known to be one of the best players in the Iraqi national team, and was a key figure in their 2007 Asian Cup victory. His younger brother, Halgurd Mulla Mohammed, is also a national team player.

Career statistics

Club

International
Scores and results list Iraq's goal tally first, score column indicates score after each Mohammed goal.

Honours 
Al-Quwa Al-Jawiya
 Iraqi Premier League: 2004–05; runner-up: 2000–01, 2001–02, 2014–15

Ansar
 Lebanese Premier League: 2005–06
 Lebanese FA Cup: 2005–06

Apollon Limassol
 Cypriot Super Cup: 2006

Persepolis
 Hazfi Cup: 2009–10

Esteghlal
 Persian Gulf Cup runner-up: 2010–11

Erbil
 AFC Cup runner-up: 2014

Iraq
 West Asian Games Gold Medalist: 2005
 AFC Asian Cup: 2007

Individual
 Soccer Iraq Team of the Decade: 2010–2019

See also
 List of men's footballers with 100 or more international caps

References

External links
 
 
 Hawar Mulla Mohammed on Goal.com
 Fan site

1981 births
Living people
People from Mosul
Iraqi Kurdish people
Iraqi footballers
Kurdish sportspeople
Association football wingers
Al-Mosul FC players
Al-Quwa Al-Jawiya players
Al Ansar FC players
Apollon Limassol FC players
Al Ain FC players
Al-Khor SC players
Anorthosis Famagusta F.C. players
Persepolis F.C. players
Erbil SC players
Esteghlal F.C. players
Zob Ahan Esfahan F.C. players
Zakho FC players
Iraqi Premier League players
Lebanese Premier League players
Cypriot First Division players
UAE Pro League players
Qatar Stars League players
Persian Gulf Pro League players
Iraqi expatriate footballers
Expatriate footballers in Lebanon
Expatriate footballers in Cyprus
Expatriate footballers in the United Arab Emirates
Expatriate footballers in Qatar
Expatriate footballers in Iran
Iraqi expatriate sportspeople in Lebanon
Iraqi expatriate sportspeople in Cyprus
Iraqi expatriate sportspeople in the United Arab Emirates
Iraqi expatriate sportspeople in Qatar
Iraqi expatriate sportspeople in Iran
Iraq international footballers
Olympic footballers of Iraq
2004 AFC Asian Cup players
Footballers at the 2004 Summer Olympics
2007 AFC Asian Cup players
2009 FIFA Confederations Cup players
2011 AFC Asian Cup players
AFC Asian Cup-winning players
FIFA Century Club